( or  in Ukrainian transliteration) is a senior non-commissioned rank or designation in the military forces of some Slavic states, and a historical military designation.

In army terminology, a starshina is equivalent to "Sergeant Major" (Most senior member at the company level) or a rank equal to a NATO OR-8. In naval terminology, starshina is a general term for junior and middle-ranking non-commissioned officers, similar in usage to "Chief Petty Officer".

Cossack Hetmanate
Among Cossacks in Ukraine, starshyna was a collective noun for categories of military officers and state officials. It derived from the offices in the Polish-Lithuanian Commonwealth. Sharshyna was subdivided into:
General Starshyna, headed by Hetman (or Quartermaster General as acting Hetman)
Quartermaster General (Генеральний обозний)
Judge General (Генеральний суддя)
Secretary General (Генеральний писар)
Adjutant General (Генеральний осавул)
Treasurer General (Генеральний підскарбій)
Ensign General (Генеральний хорунжий)
Bunchuk General (Генеральний бунчужний)
Regimental (Polkova) Starshyna, headed by Polkovnyk (Colonel)
Regimental Obozni (Quartermaster) – first Deputy Colonel. He was in charge of artillery and fortress fortifications. In the absence of a colonel he replaced him, but he was not authorized to issue universal orders (as opposed to the commanding colonel).
Regimental Judge – was in charge of a civil court in the ratusha
Regimental Osavul – assistant Colonel in Military Affairs
Regimental Khorunzhy – commander of the "Khorunzhy Cossacks", guarding the colonel and the starshina. He was in charge of regimental music and was responsible for keeping the khorugv (regiment flag).
Regimental Chancellor – secretaries at the ratusha. One was in charge of military affairs, and the other of civilian affairs.
Starshyna of Hundred (Sotenna) – headed by Sotnyk
Sotenny otaman – the deputy sotnik, implemented the duties of an obozni and a judge on a sotnia level
Sotenny Osavul – assistant sotnik in military affairs
Sotenny Khorunzhy – headed the sotnias flags
Sotenny Chancellor – a secretary
Junior Starshyna – headed by Otaman

Later, sometime after the Khmelnytsky's Uprising, it was also associated with the Ukrainian nobility which derived out of the officership and the Hetman.

Russia

Imperial Russia 

Soviet Union and Russian Federation 

The word  gained its modern meaning in the Red Army, and is a hangover from the functional titles (like "Brigade Commander" or "Assistant Platoon Leader") that were initially used by that force – the word literally means "senior". Most functional titles in the Red Army were abolished in 1942, but  remained.  was the highest non-commissioned rank in the Soviet Army until the reintroduction of the imperial rank of Praporshchik in 1972.

In the Soviet Navy, the term  was introduced between 1940 and 1943 as term equivalent to "Petty Officer" for every enlisted seaman above "Matros, 1st class."

Insignia in the Red Army (1919–1946) and Soviet Armed Forces (1946–1991)

Insignia in the Russian Federation

Insignia

Language variants
In some former communist state, the rank of "older" is used with the local language variants.

Naval variants

References

Cossack starshyna at the Encyclopedia of Ukraine

Military organization of Cossacks
Military ranks of Russia
Military ranks of the Soviet Union
Military ranks of Ukraine